Johnny Archer (born November 12, 1968 in Waycross, Georgia) is an American professional pool player. He is nicknamed "the Scorpion" (his zodiac sign is Scorpio, and one of his sponsors is Scorpion Cues). On June 8, 2009, Johnny Archer was nominated to be inducted into the Billiard Congress of America Hall of Fame.

Early days
Archer grew up with his two brothers and two sisters in Twin City, Georgia, and began playing pool at the age of 12.

Career

He is one of the most successful nine-ball players of the 1990s and 2000s, having won the majority of the game's major tournaments at least once, culminating in his being named Billiards Digest Player of the Decade at the end of the 1990s. Archer is a two-time WPA World Nine-ball Champion, winning in both 1992 when he defeated Bobby Hunter, and later again in 1997 after beating Lee Kun-fang of Chinese Taipei (Taiwan).  He was also a runner-up the following year, losing in the final to Kunihiko Takahashi of Japan. He was the 1999 US Open champion, and has won over 100 professional tournaments throughout his career.

He has also been a regular on the US Mosconi Cup team, having joined them a record seventeen times, winning on nine of those occasions.

In 2003, one of Archer's most successful years, he won tournaments such as Sudden Death Seven-ball and the first World Summit of Pool.

Archer also won the 2006 US$50,000 winner-take-all International Challenge of Champions by defeating Thorsten Hohmann in the finals.

In 2007, he won the Texas Hold 'Em Billiards Championship. While in the 2005 event the entire purse was awarded to the winner, in the 2007 event the purse was split.

The Ripley's Believe It or Not! television show, on September 3, 2003, pitted Archer and Jeremy Jones against each other in a challenge match in speed pool.  The show had them timed against each other, to try to beat the record, which at that time stood at 1 minute 30 seconds to  a full  of balls and then pocket all fifteen balls, and then move to another table and do it again.  Archer was the victor.  The event was recorded in a warehouse in Los Angeles where other challenge matches were also taking place to beat records.

Archer rejoined the staff of Inside Pool Magazine, where he writes a monthly instruction column.

For 2007, he was ranked #3 in Pool & Billiard Magazine's "Fans' Top 20 Favorite Players" poll.

Titles and achievements

Personal life
Archer lives in Acworth, Georgia with his wife Melanie and two children.  He's an avid golfer, and ascribes his strong pool break to playing a lot of golf, noting similarities in having the timing right and using one's whole body in the stroke.

References

External links

Archer's official website

American pool players
1968 births
Living people
People from Waycross, Georgia
World champions in pool
WPA World Nine-ball Champions